Qovlarsarı (also, Kovlarsary and Kovlyarsary) is a village and municipality in the Samukh Rayon of Azerbaijan.  It has a population of 1,210.

References 

Populated places in Samukh District